Jaskaran Singh (born 21 December 1991) is an Indian first-class cricketer who plays for Jharkhand.

References

External links
 

1991 births
Living people
Indian cricketers
Jharkhand cricketers
Rising Pune Supergiant cricketers
Cricketers from Jharkhand